Patricia Fara is a historian of science at the University of Cambridge.  She is a graduate of the University of Oxford and did her PhD at the University of London. She is a former Fellow of Darwin College and is an Emeritus Fellow of Clare College where she was previously Director of Studies in the History and Philosophy and Science. Fara was also a College Teaching Officer in the Department of History and Philosophy of Science. From 2016 to 2018 Fara was President of the British Society for the History of Science. In 2016 she became President of the Antiquarian Horological Society. Fara is author of numerous popular books on the history of science and has been a guest on BBC Radio 4's science and history discussion series, In Our Time.

Early life and education
Fara began her academic career as a physicist but returned to graduate studies as a mature student to specialise in History and Philosophy of Science, completing her PhD thesis at Imperial College, London in 1993.

Research and writing
Her areas of particular academic interest include the role of portraiture and art in the history of science, science in the 18th century England during the Enlightenment and the role of women in science.  She has written about numerous women in science, mathematics, engineering, and medicine including: Hertha Ayrton, Lady Helen Gleichen, Mona Chalmers Watson, Helen Gwynne-Vaughan, Isabel Emslie Hutton, Flora Murray, Ida Maclean, Marie Stopes, and Martha Annie Whiteley. She has argued for expanded access to childcare as a means of increasing the retention of women in science. She has written and co-authored a number of books for children on science.  Fara is also a reviewer of books on history of science.  She has written the award-winning Science: A Four Thousand Year History (2009)  and Erasmus Darwin: Sex, Science, and Serendipity (2012). Her most recent book is A Lab of One's Own: Science and Suffrage in the First World War" (2017).Bruton, Elizabeth (2018) 'When Suffragettes kicked open the lab door' Nature 10 January 2018 In 2013, Fara published an article in the journal Nature, stressing the fact that biographies of female scientists perpetuate stereotypes.

Awards
2011 Dingle Prize, British Society for the History of Science for Science: A Four Thousand Year History (2009)
2022 Abraham Pais Prize for History of Physics

Bibliography

 
 
 Fara, Patricia (2002) An Entertainment for Angels: Electricity in the Enlightenment Icon Books
 Fara, Patricia (2002) Newton: The Making of Genius Pan-MacMillan
 Fara, Patricia (2002) Scientists Anonymous: Great Stories of Women in Science. Totem Books.
 
 Fara, Patricia (2004) Pandora's Breeches: Women, Science and Power in the Enlightenment Pimlico Books
 Fara, Patricia (2005) Fatal Attraction: Magnetic Mysteries of the Enlightenment Icon Books
 Fara, Patricia (2009) Science: A Four Thousand Year History Oxford University Press
 
 
Fara, Patricia (2021) Life After Gravity: Isacc Newton's London Career Oxford University Press https://global.oup.com/academic/product/life-after-gravity-9780198841029?facet_narrowbypubdate_facet=Next%203%20months&lang=en&cc=es#

Broadcasts
BBC Radio 4 In Our Time 'Ada Lovelace' 6 March 2008
BBC Radio 4 In Our Time 'Vitalism' 28 October 2008.
BBC Radio 4 In Our Time 'Baconian Science' 2 April 2009.
BBC Radio 4 In Our Time 'Calculus' 24 September 2009
BBC Radio 4 In Our Time 'Women and Enlightenment Science' 4 November 2010.
BBC Radio 4 In Our Time 'Robert Hooke' 18 February 2016.
BBC Radio 4 The Forum 'Marie Curie - A Pioneering Life' 19 August 2017
BBC Radio 4 In Our Time 'Rosalind Franklin' 22 February 2018
BBC Radio 4 Science Stories 'Madame Lavoisier's Translation of Oxygen' 21 August 2019.

References

Academics of the University of Cambridge
Living people
Alumni of the University of Oxford
Alumni of Imperial College London
Historians of science
British women historians
Year of birth missing (living people)
20th-century British historians
20th-century British women writers
21st-century British historians
21st-century British women writers